The Journal of Intelligent and Robotic Systems is a peer-reviewed scientific journal that covers theory and practice in all areas of intelligent systems and robotics. It is published by  Springer Science+Business Media and the editor-in-chief is Kimon P. Valavanis (University of Denver).

Abstracting and indexing 
The journal is abstracted and indexed in PsycINFO, Science Citation Index Expanded, and Scopus. According to the Journal Citation Reports, the journal has a 2018 impact factor of 2.020. The founding editor-in-chief was Spyros G. Tzafestas, who continued his editorship until his retirement in 2006.

References

External links 

Robotics journals
Publications established in 1988
Springer Science+Business Media academic journals
Monthly journals
English-language journals